Flixton may refer to the following places in England:

Flixton, Greater Manchester, part of the Metropolitan Borough of Trafford
Flixton F.C.
Flixton railway station
Flixton (ward)
Flixton Girls' School
Flixton Junior School
Flixton, North Yorkshire, a village near Scarborough
Flixton, Lothingland, a village near Lowestoft, in Suffolk
Flixton, The Saints, a village south of Bungay, in Suffolk
RAF Flixton